Philip John Toelkes, also known as Swami Prem Niren and Philip Niren Toelkes, is an American lawyer and follower of Rajneesh who served as the second mayor of Rajneeshpuram from 1985 until the commune's disbandment in 1986. He served as the personal Lawyer of Bhagwan Shree Rajneesh.

Early life and education 
Toelkes was born in Tigard, Oregon and raised Catholic. He earned an undergraduate degree from the University of San Francisco and a Juris Doctor from the University of San Francisco School of Law.

Career 
Toelkes began his career as an attorney in Los Angeles, working with the Manatt Law Firm which was, at the time, the fastest growing law firm in the U.S. After traveling to Pune and meeting with Rajneesh, he quit his job and relocated to the newly-established Rajneeshpuram commune in Wasco County, Oregon. From 1981 to 1990, Toelkes acted as Rajneesh's personal attorney, until the latter's death.

Toelkes was the director of the Rajneesh Legal Services Corporation and later mayor of Rajneeshpuram, succeeding Krishna Deva. After his first marriage ended, he remarried Ma Prem Isabel, director of public relations for Rajneeshpuram. No legal charges were ever filed against Toelkes, he continues to practice law, and he remains loyal to Osho.

He is featured in Wild Wild Country, a Netflix documentary series about the controversial Indian guru  and has written an account of the legal aspects of the cases against Osho and Rajneeshpuram brought by the U.S. Government.

References

External links
 
 IMDb Entry
 Unregistered 53: Swami Prem Niren (a.k.a. Philip Toelkes)

Year of birth missing (living people)
Living people
American lawyers
Rajneesh movement
People from Tigard, Oregon